Rhizoclonium is a genus of green algae in the family Cladophoraceae.

References

External links

Cladophorales genera
Cladophoraceae